Oriol Bohigas i Martí (22 December 1937 – 22 October 2013) was a Spanish and French physicist.

Bohigas was born in Barcelona, where he studied physics at the university.  In 1966 he became researcher at France's CNRS, where he would stay until the end of his career, becoming Director of Research Emeritus at the LPTMS laboratory (Laboratoire de Physique Théorique et Modèles Statistiques), of which he was one of the founders, at Université de Paris-Sud in Orsay. Before that, he had been head of the Division of Theoretical Physics of the Institute of Nuclear Physics (IPN), on the campus of the same university.  He died in Orsay.

His fundamental contributions to the theory of quantum chaos and its applications, particularly in nuclear physics, granted him the Gay-Lussac-Humboldt Prize (1991), the Holweck Medal (1999), and an honoris causa doctorate by the Technische Universität Darmstadt, among other recognitions.

Publications

References

External links 
 Oriol Bohigas at Scholarpedia
 
 
 

1937 births
2013 deaths
Theoretical physicists
Chaos theorists
Nuclear physicists
Spanish physicists